Nocardioides oleivorans is a chitinolytic and aerobic bacterium from the genus Nocardioides which has been isolated from an oil sample in Gifhorn, Germany. Nocardioides oleivorans has the ability to degrade crude oil.

References

Further reading

External links
Type strain of Nocardioides oleivorans at BacDive -  the Bacterial Diversity Metadatabase

oleivorans
Bacteria described in 2005